The open para-sport triples at the 2014 Commonwealth Games, was part of the lawn bowls category, which took place between 28 and 31 July 2014 at the Kelvingrove Lawn Bowls Centre.

Sectional play

Section A

Section B

Semifinals

Finals

Gold medal match

Bronze medal match

References

Open para-sport triples